The January 8–13, 2011 North American blizzard was a major Mid-Atlantic nor'easter and winter storm, and a New England blizzard. The storm also affected portions of the Southeastern regions of the United States. This storm came just two weeks after a previous major blizzard severely affected most of these same areas in December 2010. It was the second significant snowstorm to affect the region during the 2010–11 North American winter storm season.

Meteorological history
The storm took on a similar track as the storm that had crippled the region in December 2010. The storm formed as a low pressure system in the Gulf of Mexico, which interacted with an upper-level low pressure system that dropped down from central Canada. Like the previous storm, it was fueled by a great amount of southern stream energy. In mid-Atlantic states, the track of the storm was over 50 miles east of the previous one; besides, the storm was a fast-moving system. As a result, snowfall totals in these areas were not expected to reach those of the December 2010 blizzard two weeks earlier. However, the storm dumped over 2 feet of snow in some areas in New England before it moved out to sea on Thursday.

Impact
 An Atlanta Hawks game was postponed due to the ice.

The storm affected portions of New Jersey, New York, much of Connecticut, Rhode Island, and Massachusetts overnight late Tuesday into Wednesday, January 12, 2011. Although the storm was expected to intensify to become a blizzard, New York City was spared from the worst. The city's public schools remained open. By Wednesday morning, Central Park had received 9.1 inches of snow; however, a lot of the areas in central and eastern Long Island had seen 15 to 20 inches of snow before it all ended. In Edison, New Jersey, there was a reported snowfall total of 10.2 inches of snow.

Connecticut bore the brunt of the storm, with many locations checking in with snowfall totals of 20 to 30 inches.  Heavy snow caused the roof of an apartment building in Norwich to collapse, forcing the evacuation of 10 residents. The storm forced state troopers to close a 50-mile stretch of Interstate 95 in southwest Connecticut due to numerous trucks becoming stuck on the highway in the snow. The storm also caused the bubble covering the Cheshire Community Pool in Cheshire, Connecticut, to collapse, forcing its closure for the season.

This blizzard together with blizzards later in the month is estimated to have led to a loss of 150,000 jobs in the United States for January.

See also
 December 2010 North American blizzard

References

Blizzards in the United States
January 8–13, 2011 blizzard
2011 meteorology
Blizzard,2011-01-08
Blizzard,2011-01-08
Blizzard,2011-01-08